Animal World was an American television wildlife documentary series hosted by Bill Burrud and airing between 1968 and 1971. Originally airing on NBC as a summer replacement, it moved to CBS, then ABC before going into syndication. Debuting on 16 June 1968, under the name Animal Kingdom, it was renamed Animal World beginning with the 11 August 1968 broadcast.

Episodes

References

1968 American television series debuts
1971 American television series endings
1960s American documentary television series
1970s American documentary television series
English-language television shows
Nature educational television series
NBC original programming
American Broadcasting Company original programming
CBS original programming
Television series about animals